Burusho may refer to:

 Burusho people or Burusho, are the ethnic group of people majority in Hunza and Upper Chitral in Pakistan
 Burushaski language, spoken by the Burusho people in Hunza